Karl Skraup (31 July 1898 – 2 October 1958) was an Austrian stage and film actor. From 1947 until his death in 1958 he worked at the Volkstheater in Vienna.

Selected filmography

References

External links 

1898 births
1958 deaths
Austrian male film actors